Before the Fall can refer to:

 Before the Fall (2004 film), a 2004 German film
 Before the Fall (2015 film), a 2015 Cambodian film
 "Before the Fall" (song), a song by Another Animal
 Attack on Titan: Before the Fall, a light novel and manga